The men's triathlon was part of the Triathlon at the 2018 Commonwealth Games program. The competition was held on 5 April 2018 in the Southport Broadwater Parklands.

Schedule
All times are Australian Eastern Standard Time (UTC+10)

Competition format
The race was held over the "sprint distance" and consisted of  swimming,  road bicycling, and  road running.

Results

References

Triathlon at the 2018 Commonwealth Games